Hanspeter Seiler (born September 9, 1933) is a former Swiss politician and President of the National Council (1999–2000). He sat on the national council from 1987 to 2000.

References

1933 births
Living people
Members of the National Council (Switzerland)
Presidents of the National Council (Switzerland)